Le salamandre is a 1969 Italian film directed by Alberto Cavallone. It gained a great commercial success and launched the brief careers of the two main actresses, Erna Schürer and Beryl Cunningham.

Cast 
Erna Schürer as Ursula
Beryl Cunningham as Uta 
Antonio Casale as Dr. Henry Duval (Credited as Anthony Vernon)

Production
Cavallone originally developed the script for La salamandre with Sergio Lentati which originally contained more political material. director Alberto Cavallone, relocated to Rome where he worked on television commercials and writing scripts for directors like Duccio Tessari and Nino Zanchin. The film that was shot focused more on erotic content. The film developed was a cheaper production of 28 million Italian lire from first time producer Carlo Maietto.

The film was shot in Northern Africa with interior scenes shot in De Paolis Studios.

Release
Originally titled  C'era una bionda after the distributor Cidif backed out and was picked up for distribution by Paris Etoile Film. It was distributed theatrically in 26 February 1969 in Italy.  The film did well in the Italian box office grossing 500 million Italian lire.

See also
 List of Italian films of 1969

References

Footnotes

Sources

External links

1969 films
1969 romantic drama films
Italian romantic drama films
Erotic romance films
Italian erotic drama films
Films set in antiquity
LGBT-related romantic drama films
Films shot in Africa
1960s erotic drama films
1969 LGBT-related films
1960s Italian films